The Royal Tomb of Akhenaten, located in the Royal Wadi at Amarna, is the burial place of the Eighteenth Dynasty pharaoh Akhenaten.

Layout
A flight of twenty steps, with a central inclined plane leads to the door and a long straight descending corridor. Halfway down this corridor a suite of unfinished rooms (perhaps intended for Nefertiti). The main corridor continues to descend, and to the right again a second suite of rooms branches off.

The corridor then descends via steps into an ante-room, and then to the pillared burial chamber where his granite sarcophagus sat in a slight dip in the floor. It was decorated by carvings of Nefertiti acting as a protective goddess, and by the ever-present sun-disks of the Aten.

Decoration

The second suite of three chambers (referred to as Alpha, Beta and Gamma) are believed to be used for the burial of Meketaten, Akhenaten's second daughter. Two of the chambers (Alpha and Gamma) are decorated and depict very similar scenes: in the Alpha chamber Akhenaten and Nefertiti bend over the inert body of a woman, weeping and gripping each other's arms for support. Nearby a nurse stands with a baby in her arms, accompanied by a fan-bearer, which indicates the baby's royal status. The names in the scene have been hacked out. In the Gamma chamber a very similar scene is shown; here the hieroglyphs identify the dead young woman as Meketaten. In the same chamber another scene shows Meketaten standing under a canopy, which is usually associated with childbirth, but can also interpreted as representing the rebirth of the princess. In front of her, amongst courtiers, stand Akhenaten, Nefertiti and their three remaining daughters, Meritaten, Ankhesenpaaten and Neferneferuaten Tasherit. The presence of a royal baby causes many to believe the young princess died in childbirth (in this case the father is most likely to have been Akhenaten himself, marrying his daughter), but it cannot be proven.

Large amounts of the decoration have been destroyed by flooding.

After burial

His body was probably removed after the court returned to Thebes, and reburied somewhere in the Valley of the Kings, possibly in KV55. His sarcophagus was destroyed, but has since been reconstructed and now sits in the garden of the Egyptian Museum in Cairo.

Excavation and preservation
The tomb was excavated by Alessandro Barsanti, in 1893–1894.

See also
 Tombs of the Nobles (Amarna)
 Anonymous Tombs in Amarna

References

1893 archaeological discoveries
Amarna tombs
Akhenaten